Meghan Ory (born August 20, 1982) is a Canadian television and film actress. She is best known for her role as Red Riding Hood/Ruby on the ABC fantasy series Once Upon a Time and also starred in the short-lived CBS drama Intelligence as Riley Neal. Ory currently stars in the Hallmark family drama Chesapeake Shores as Abby O'Brien.

Career
She was born in Victoria, British Columbia. She started acting in theater before her teens, but her mother forbade her from taking roles in film and television in order to be able to pay for her head shots.

Her first professional acting role came in 1999 in the Fox Family Channel television movie, The Darklings, opposite Suzanne Somers and Timothy Busfield. A guest appearance on the television series The Crow: Stairway to Heaven followed, before she landed her first regular TV role on the Fox Family series Higher Ground in 2000, along with Hayden Christensen and A.J. Cook. After appearing on the MTV series 2ge+her (2000), Ory joined the cast of the Canadian television series Vampire High in 2001.

She continued working in television with guest appearances on The Outer Limits, Dark Angel, Glory Days, and Maybe It’s Me. She appeared in the TV movies Lucky 7 and National Lampoon's Thanksgiving Family Reunion  in 2003, as well as the TV series Smallville, Life As We Know It, and The Collector, and Family Reunion in 2004. Also in 2004, Ory made her feature film debut in Decoys, directed by Matthew Hastings, whom she had previously worked with on Higher Ground and Vampire High.

In 2006, Ory appeared in UPN series South Beach, and the Hallmark mini-series Merlin's Apprentice, alongside Sam Neill and Miranda Richardson. She also appeared in the feature film John Tucker Must Die and the made-for-TV film Her Sister's Keeper. In 2007, Ory appeared in Blonde and Blonder with Pamela Anderson and Denise Richards, and the television film Nightmare. In 2008, Ory appeared in the television series Flash Gordon episode "Thicker Than Water". In 2009, Ory appeared in the television series Knight Rider (2008) episode 17 (Season 1) "I love the Knight Life" as Megan Connelly. She portrayed Claire Thompson in the horror-thriller film Dark House. She also appeared as a guest star of Canadian TV Series Sanctuary as Laura. In 2010, Ory appeared in the Keystone Light beer commercial "Rescue of Beer"..

Beginning fall 2011, Ory starred as Red Riding Hood/Ruby on the ABC fantasy series Once Upon a Time. She was in most of the episodes of the first season and was promoted to the main cast in the second season of the series.  She left the cast at the end of the second season, to focus on her new show Intelligence, but made guest appearances in four episodes during the third season. Ory also returned to the show during its fifth season for three episodes.

In March 2013, Ory was cast as the female lead opposite Josh Holloway in the CBS drama pilot Intelligence, which co-stars Marg Helgenberger. The show was cancelled after one season due to poor ratings.

In the 2016 Hallmark original series Chesapeake Shores, she stars as a divorced career woman with two young daughters who returns to her hometown.

Personal life
In 2008, she married John Reardon, with whom she had worked on Merlin's Apprentice''. In May 2018, Ory announced that they had welcomed their first child, a son.
In July 2019, Ory announced that she was expecting their second child, a daughter, as stated in an interview. In October 2019, Ory announced that they had welcomed their second child.  She currently resides in Newfoundland, Canada and is a dual citizen of Canada and the United States.

Filmography

References

External links

 

1982 births
Canadian film actresses
Canadian television actresses
Living people
Actresses from Victoria, British Columbia
20th-century Canadian actresses
21st-century Canadian actresses